Stakčín is a larger village and a municipality in Snina District in the Prešov Region of north-eastern Slovakia.

Geography
The municipality lies in the Cirocha river valley, at an altitude of 257 metres and with a total area of 167.742 km2. According to the 2013 census it had a population of 2452 inhabitants. It lies between the Vihorlat and Bukovské vrchy mountains. The municipality is the seat of the Poloniny National Park governing body.

History
In historical records the village was first mentioned in 1492 as Staccyn. The area was a battleground in the Slovak-Hungarian War.

Twin towns — sister cities

Stakčín is twinned with:
 Lutowiska, Poland
 Slavonice, Czech Republic

References

External links
 
 

 
Zemplín (region)